The Anatolian boar (Sus scrofa libycus) is a subspecies of wild boar endemic to Turkey, Levant, Israel and Transcaucasia. It is likely to be one of the ancestors of today's domestic pigs.

References

Mammals described in 1868
Mammals of Turkey
Wild boars
Taxa named by George Robert Gray